Terrence Dzvukamanja (born 5 May 1994) is a Zimbabwean footballer who plays as a midfielder for Orlando Pirates and the Zimbabwe national football team.

References

External links

1994 births
Living people
Zimbabwean footballers
Zimbabwe international footballers
Association football midfielders
Ngezi Platinum F.C. players
Bidvest Wits F.C. players
Orlando Pirates F.C. players
South African Premier Division players
Zimbabwean expatriate footballers
Zimbabwean expatriate sportspeople in South Africa
Expatriate soccer players in South Africa